Heliconius hortense, the Mexican longwing, Mexican heliconian or mountain longwing, is a heliconiid butterfly.

Description
The basic color of the uppersides of the wings is black, with a vertical white band on the forewings and an horizontal red band on the hindwings. The undersides are dark brown, with a white band on the forewings and a few red spots at the base of the hindwings. The adults feed on pollens and live up to six months. Females usually lay yellow eggs singly on shoots of various host plants, mainly Passiflora species, of which caterpillars primarily feed.

Distribution
Heliconius hortense occurs in eastern and western Mexico and from Honduras to Ecuador.

Habitat
This species can be found in cloud forest from sea level to 2300 m.

References

Mountain Longwing, Neotropical Butterflies
 Butterflies of America
 Tree of Life

hortense
Butterflies described in 1844
Nymphalidae of South America